Frederick Conrad James Lullfitz (22 January 1914 – 1983) was a Western Australian botanist and horticulturist.

Born in Perth, Western Australia in 1914, he studied botany at the University of Western Australia. During his long and varied career he spent five years as a plant and seed collector for the Kings Park and Botanic Garden, and many years studying and advising on the flora of the north-west. He was a life member of the West Australian Wildflower Society.

Among his scientific contributions is his collection of the type specimen of Acacia anaticeps. Banksia lullfitzii was named in his honour.

References

1914 births
1983 deaths
20th-century Australian botanists
Botanists active in Australia
Australian horticulturists
People from Perth, Western Australia
Plant collectors